Riskified is a publicly traded company that provides software as a service (SaaS) fraud and chargeback prevention technology.

History
Riskified’s technology uses behavioral analysis, elastic linking, proxy detection, and machine learning to detect and prevent fraud.  Riskified backs transactions approved by its technology with a chargeback 100% money-back guarantee in the event of fraud.

Riskified was founded in 2012 by Eido Gal and Assaf Feldman. As of 2018, Riskified secured $63.7 million in funding. In November 2019, Riskified announced a Series E funding round of $165 million, led by General Atlantic and joined by Fidelity Management & Research, Winslow Capital, and existing investors.

On July 28, 2021, Riskified launched its initial public offering on the NYSE, valuing the company at $4.3 billion.

References

External links
 

2012 establishments in Israel
Internet security
Software companies established in 2012
Software companies of Israel
Security companies of Israel
2021 initial public offerings
Companies listed on the New York Stock Exchange
Companies based in Tel Aviv